was a Japanese daimyō of the late Edo period, who ruled the Sekiyado Domain. He served as a rōjū in the Tokugawa shogunate, and briefly as chief rōjū (rōjū shuza 老中首座).

Family
 Father: Okusa Takayoshi (d.1840)
 Foster Father: Kuze Hirotaka (1799-1830)
 Wife: Abe Masakiyo's daughter
 Children:
 Kuze Hirofumi (1854-1899)
 Kuze Hironari (1858-1911)
 Kuze Hiromitsu
 daughter married Sakurai Tomoyoshi

References
Totman, Conrad. The Collapse of the Tokugawa Bakufu, 1862–1868. Honolulu: University of Hawai'i Press, 1980.

1819 births
1864 deaths
Rōjū
Kuze clan
Fudai daimyo
People from Tokyo